Next Level Games, Inc. is a Canadian video game developer owned by Nintendo based in Vancouver. Founded in August 2002, Next Level Games specializes in creating console video games. Their first project was NHL Hitz Pro, which was published by Midway Games in 2003. The company is best known for its work with Nintendo, the Mario Strikers games and Punch-Out!! for the Wii, Luigi's Mansion: Dark Moon and Metroid Prime: Federation Force for the Nintendo 3DS, and Luigi's Mansion 3 for the Nintendo Switch.

Among other awards, Next Level Games has been named one of "Canada's Top 100 Employers" and one of BC's Top Employers in 2008, 2009 and 2012. The company has been featured in Maclean's magazine and BC Business magazine.

In January 2014, the studio announced that it would work exclusively with Nintendo from then on. In January 2021, Nintendo announced that it had purchased Next Level Games after "A number of owner-directors recently determined that the time is right for them to sell their shares, and NLG therefore began exploring potential sale transactions". This acquisition took place on March 1.

List of games developed

Notes

Cancelled
 WWE Titans: Parts Unknown - PS2, Xbox
 Super Mario Spikers – Wii
 Catalyst - PS3, Xbox 360
 Clockwerk – Wii, X360, PS3

References

External links
 

2002 establishments in British Columbia
2021 mergers and acquisitions
Canadian companies established in 2002
Canadian subsidiaries of foreign companies
Companies based in Vancouver
First-party video game developers
Nintendo divisions and subsidiaries
Video game companies established in 2002
Video game companies of Canada
Video game development companies